"Funk on Ah Roll" is a song written by James Brown and Derrick Monk and recorded by James Brown. It appears in three different versions on his 1998 album I'm Back, two of which are remixes. A number of additional remixes of the song, including a popular UK garage mix by Grant Nelson as Bump & Flex, were issued on 12" and CD in the United Kingdom in 1999, resulting in the song reaching No. 40 on the UK Singles Chart and No. 1 on the UK Dance Singles Chart. It did not chart in the United States. 

The track reuses the guitar part and horn section of Brown's 1971 release "Hot Pants".

Critical reception
Rolling Stone reviewed the song favorably, commenting that it "reclaim[s] Jimmy Nolen chicken scratch for the engine of life it is".

References

1998 songs
1999 singles
James Brown songs
UK garage songs
Songs written by James Brown
Eagle Records singles